Sous lieutenant André-Henri Martenot de Cordou (born 14 March 1893, date of death unknown) was a French World War I flying ace credited with eight aerial victories.

Biography
See also Aerial victory standards of World War I

André-Henri Martenot de Cordou was born in Chalezeule, France on 14 March 1893.

He began his military service on 8 August 1914 as an infantryman. On 5 August 1915, he transferred to aviation duty to begin pilot training. He received his Military Pilot's Brevet on 26 December 1915. After further training, he was posted to Escadrille C.28 on 14 April 1916 to fly Caudrons. On 20 May 1916, despite flying a reconnaissance machine, he shot down a German recon plane. He was severely wounded in the combat.

On 24 March 1917, he was posted to another Caudron squadron, thence to a fighter detachment that became Escadrille N.94. Now flying a Nieuport fighter, Martenot de Cordou shot down a German Rumpler on 25 July 1917 for his second victory.

A temporary promotion to Sous lieutenant raised him to officer status on 25 January 1918. Newly outfitted with a SPAD fighter, between 1 April and 13 September 1918, he downed six more German airplanes.

Martenot de Cordou's life is unrecorded beyond this point.

Sources of information

References
 Franks, Norman; Bailey, Frank (1993). Over the Front: The Complete Record of the Fighter Aces and Units of the United States and French Air Services, 1914–1918. London, UK: Grub Street Publishing. .

 D. Porret (1983). Les "as" français de la Grande Guerre. City of publication unknown: Service historique de l'Armée de l'air. 

1893 births
Year of death missing
French World War I flying aces